Higher education in Pakistan is the systematic process of students continuing their education beyond secondary school, learned societies and two-year colleges. The governance of higher education is maintained under the Higher Education Commission (Pakistan) (HEC) which oversees the financial funding, research outputs and teaching quality in the country. In Pakistan, the higher education system includes the public, private and military universities, all accredited by the HEC. Since independence, new universities have expanded throughout the country with support provided by the University Grants Commission (UGC), which had been an autonomous institution of recognizing universities until 2002 when it was preceded by the Higher Education Commission. Pakistan produces about 445,000 university graduates and 10,000 computer science graduates annually. Following public and private higher education institutions are active in the country:

Islamabad

Balochistan

Khyber Pakhtunkhwa

Punjab

Sindh

Azad Jammu and Kashmir

Gilgit-Baltistan

Gallery

See also 
Education in Pakistan
Rankings of universities in Pakistan
List of educational boards in Pakistan
List of engineering universities and colleges in Pakistan
List of computing schools in Pakistan
List of business schools in Pakistan
List of pharmacy schools in Pakistan
List of medical schools in Pakistan
Pakistan Academy of Sciences

References 

Universities
Pakistan
 
Pakistan